Pallada was the lead ship in the  of protected cruisers in the Imperial Russian Navy. She was built in the Admiralty Shipyard at Saint Petersburg, Russia. The new class was a major improvement on previous Russian cruisers, although the armor protection was light.

Background
The Pallada class consisted of three cruisers built expressly with the intention of strengthening the Russian fleet in the Far East. , which survives in Saint Petersburg as a museum ship, was laid down in June 1897 and was not launched until May 1900. Soon after commissioning, both Pallada and Diana were assigned to the Russian First Pacific Squadron at Port Arthur, Manchuria.

Operational history

In the initial Japanese attacks on Port Arthur on the night of 8 February 1904, Pallada was torpedoed on the port side amidships, but despite a fire in her coal bunker, she was not seriously damaged.

In August 1904 at the Battle of the Yellow Sea, after being struck by a torpedo, Pallada managed to make her way back to Port Arthur, and was thus unable to break through the Japanese blockade along with a number of other Russian cruisers. Thereafter, Pallada was trapped in the harbor. Her guns were removed to help strengthen the land defenses and most of her crew was reassigned to serve as infantry. Pallada was sunk by Japanese 11-inch siege howitzers on 8 December 1904.

After the end of the war, the wreck of Pallada was raised and towed to Japan, where it was repaired and commissioned into the Imperial Japanese Navy as a prize of war. Renamed , she served as a training vessel and later as a minelayer until decommissioned in 1922 and sunk as a target in 1924.

References

 Howarth, Stephen.  The Fighting Ships of the Rising Sun: The Drama of the Imperial Japanese Navy, 1895–1945. Atheneum; (1983) 
 Jentsura, Hansgeorg. Warships of the Imperial Japanese Navy, 1869–1945. Naval Institute Press (1976).

External links
  Photos of the Pallada-class ships

1899 ships
Ships built at Admiralty Shipyard
Cruisers of the Imperial Russian Navy
Naval ships of Russia
Russo-Japanese War cruisers of Russia
Shipwrecks of the Russo-Japanese War
Shipwrecks of China
Captured ships
Naval ships captured by Japan during the Russo-Japanese War
Ships sunk by coastal artillery